Kim Dae-woo (born 1962) is a South Korean film director and screenwriter. Kim started his filmmaking career by winning the 1991 Korean Film Council Screenplay Contest. He was an accomplished screenwriter with a number of hit scripts, including The Girl for Love and The One for Marriage (1993), An Affair (1998), Rainbow Trout (1999), and Untold Scandal (2003). Making a switch to directing, he debuted with the hit period drama film Forbidden Quest (2006), followed by The Servant (2010) and Obsessed (2014). Forbidden Quest won the Best New Director at the 42nd Baeksang Arts Awards, and Best New Director and Best Screenplay at the 26th Korean Association of Film Critics Awards in 2006.

Filmography

As screenwriter 
The Girl for Love and The One for Marriage (1993)
Wedding Story 2 (1994)
Pirates (1994)
Kill the Love (1996)
Ivan the Mercenary (1997)
An Affair (1998)
Rainbow Trout (1999)
The Foul King (2000)
Untold Scandal (2003)

As director 
Forbidden Quest (2006) (also credited as screenwriter)
The Servant (2010) (also credited as screenwriter)
Age of Milk  (short film, 2011)
Obsessed (2014) (also credited as screenwriter, producer, planner)
The Witch (2016)

As script editor 
The Police, Chil-duk, and Buddhist Monk (1990)
Final Blow (1996)
Road Movie (2002)

As TV screenwriter 
Servant, The Untold Story of Bang-ja (Channel CGV, 2011) (also credited as executive producer)

Awards 
2006 42nd Baeksang Arts Awards: Best New Director (Forbidden Quest)
2006 26th Korean Association of Film Critics Awards: Best New Director (Forbidden Quest)
2006 26th Korean Association of Film Critics Awards: Best Screenplay (Forbidden Quest)
2010 11th Busan Film Critics Awards: Best Screenplay (The Servant)

References

External links 
 
 
 

1962 births
Living people
South Korean film directors
South Korean screenwriters